Wanne is a village of Wallonia and a district of the municipality of Trois-Ponts, located in the province of liège, Belgium. 

The villages of Aisômont, Wanneranval, Bouyin, Le Bairsoû and Spineux are nearby.

Former municipalities of Liège Province
Trois-Ponts